Karankajärvi is a medium-sized lake in the Kymijoki main catchment area. It is located in the region Central Finland and in Saarijärvi municipality. A strait divides the lake in two parts, Ala-Karanka and Ylä-Karanka.

In Finland there are 4 lakes that are called Karankajärvi. This is the biggest of them.

See also
List of lakes in Finland

References

Lakes of Saarijärvi